Rachel, also known as Market Foundation Piggy Bank, Rachael the Pig, Rachel the Pig or Rachel the Piggy Bank, is an outdoor bronze sculpture of a piggy bank, designed by Georgia Gerber and located at Pike Place Market in Seattle, Washington, in the United States. It was dedicated on August 17, 1986, the market's 79th birthday, and is maintained by the Pike Place Market Foundation. Modeled after a pig (also named Rachel) that lived on Whidbey Island and was the 1985 Island County prize-winner. In 2006 Rachel received roughly $9,000 annually while in 2018, donations increased to $20,000. The money is collected by the Market Foundation to fund the Market's social services.

Description

The Smithsonian Institution describes Rachel as a "life-size, realistic figure" of a sow piggy bank. The Pike Place Market Foundation calls it the "mascot" of Pike Place Market.

Bronze footprints are on the sidewalk leading to the pig figure. One nearby plaque reads: "Market Foundation Piggy Bank. Made possible by a gift from Fratelli's Ice Cream, August 17, 1986". Another states that money deposited into the piggy bank benefits local human service organizations.

History 
The sculpture was surveyed by the Smithsonian's Save Outdoor Sculpture! program in April 1995 and was deemed "well maintained".

On February 5, 2011, Rachel was struck by a taxicab and was knocked off its concrete base. The sculpture suffered cosmetic damage, including a  crack along the left ear and a dent on its left side, and was repaired at Gerber's studio on Whidbey Island. Rachel returned to the Pike Place Market on March 18, 2011, after a tour of Seattle landmarks in a vintage farm truck.

Rachel was joined by a "cousin" named Billie, installed in July 2011 at the Western Avenue entrance to the market.

See also

 Pigs in popular culture

References

Further reading
 

1986 establishments in Washington (state)
1986 sculptures
Animal sculptures in Washington (state)
Bronze sculptures in Washington (state)
Outdoor sculptures in Seattle
Pigs in art
Pike Place Market
Statues in Seattle
Central Waterfront, Seattle